The Pori National Urban Park, located in the town of Pori, Finland, was established in May 2002 with the goal of preserving the story of the phases of development of the town born at the mouth of the river Kokemäenjoki. It emphasizes the importance of the culturally valuable building legacy, as well as the boulevards and other parkland. The most prominent monuments are the industrial buildings on the north bank of the Kokemäenjoki, the Neo-gothic Central church of Pori, and the Junnelius palace, a Neo-renaissance building which is currently used as the City Hall. The National Urban Park also contains the Pori bridge; the Old Courthouse; "stone Pori", a unique collection of stone buildings; the Juselius Mausoleum, and Kirjurinluoto island, made famous by the Pori Jazz Festival.

Green corridor through the town
The Pori National Urban Park forms a single green corridor traversing the city from the Kokemäenjoki river delta, through the city center to the Isomäki open-air sports complex, on to the countryside surrounding the town. The park juxtaposes built-up sections of the city, natural parks, play areas, and elements of cultural landscape.

History
Pori was founded in 1558 by Duke John, John III of Sweden, at which time the mouth of the Kokemäenjoki was at the site of the present town centre. As a result of the rise of the land and the decomposition of river silt, over time, islets were formed off the shore. The names of the islets come from the historical recreation areas of the city officials. The area distinguishes itself by the remnants of the idyllic villa community of early twentieth-century workers "summer homes". An example of an English-style park, Kirjurinluoto in particular has been the recreational area for Pori people for over a century. In 1996, a beach was added, along with the Pelle Hermanni children’s playground. Kirjurinluoto has been the site of the Pori Jazz festival since 1966. The park complex is being expanded towards the Kirjurinluoto Arena, on Raatimiehenluoto. Kirjurinluoto is connected to the city centre by the pontoon bridge Taavi. The Pormestari bridge, completed in the summer of 2001, connects Kirjurinluoto to the Pormestarinluoto and Isosanta districts of Pori.

Nature a strong presence
The Kokemäenjoki river flows through the middle of the Pori national urban park, and from its northern side the river fans out towards the sea into the widest river delta of the Nordic countries. The riverbank groves reaches right up to the town centre, whose crisscross boulevards are known for providing a nesting place for rooks. To the south, the urban park is connected directly with the surrounding countryside.

The islands are known for their captive bird populations, including peacocks, different species of pheasants, collared turtle doves, as well as wild species.

Industrial history of the North bank
Industrialization gave rise to a heritage of buildings along the riverbank, which have been well preserved. The north bank of the Kokemäenjoki is dominated by the redbrick building of the cotton mill. Large-scale industry has, however, partly given way after the period of industrialization, to make room for a thriving center of excellence, containing the university center of Pori.

Pearl of the urban park - the south bank of the river, Eteläranta
The stone buildings on the south bank of the river Kokemäenjoki with their administrative buildings and the boulevards that dissect the center tell of numerous fires in the city and of the set of values of that time. "Kivi-Pori" (stone Pori), built in the spirit of the neo-renaissance, is a cultural environment of national significance.

Avenues a part of the townscape
The key features of the urban park – the tree-lined avenues, which crisscross the center of Pori – have featured in the city structure since the last town fire of 1852. Pori's national urban park is an integral part of the inhabitants' everyday life with the opportunities it brings for recreation. The pedestrianized area in the town center, Promenadi-Pori, which has been developed since the 1970s, is now complemented by the national urban park of Pori.

The Portal
Railway buildings have brought their own theme to the national urban park of Pori. The old wooden railway station of Pori is located at the end of Länsipuisto (West Avenue) and the present railway station built in the functional style lies to the south. The Portal, an underpass going under the railway station, was completed in 1998 and connects the southern and northern areas of the urban park. The length of the zone is 11 km and at the point of the central avenues the zone measures almost 3 km in the east-west direction. The width of the urban park varies from a kilometer at the islands and the forest of Pori to only a hundred meters at the central avenues. The narrowest point of the urban park is as it passes below the railway and highway 2 along the Portal. The total surface area of the park is about 9.5 km².

References

Pori
Urban public parks
Tourist attractions in Satakunta
Geography of Satakunta